Banco de Desenvolvimento de Angola  (English:  Development Bank of Angola) (BDA) is the public bank of Angola to finance investments in "strategic long-term economic development" of the country. It was created July 2006 by government decree No. 37/06. 

The BDA administers the Fundo Nacional de Desenvolvimento - FND (National Development Fund - NDF) which is supplied by 5% of the fiscal results of the petroleum industry of Angola and 2% of the fiscal results of the diamond activities of Angola. 

In 2008, the bank financed projects worth 8.7 billion Kwanzas, corresponding to about $ US 116 million.

External links and sources

Banco de Desenvolvimento de Angola 

Banks of Angola
Development finance institutions